The 2011–12 season of Austria Wien is the 100th season in club
history. The season for Austria Wien started on 14 July 2011 with a UEFA Europa League qualifying match against Rudar Pljevlja.

Review and events
Austria Wien started their season with a 3–0 win in the UEFA Europa League 2nd Qualifying Round on 14 July 2011 against Rudar Pljevlja from Montenegro. They started their domestic season with a 2–0 loss to Red Bull Salzburg in Salzburg after giving up 2 goals within a 2-minute period. Austria Wien advanced to the Group Stage of the UEFA Europa League after defeating Gaz Metan by a 3–2 aggregate scoreline. Austria Wien started the Group Stage with a 2–1 loss to Metalist Kharkiv.

Matches

Legend

Bundesliga

League table

ÖFB-Samsung-Cup

UEFA Europa League

Qualifying rounds

Play-off Round

Group stage

Players

Transfers

Roster and statistics

|}

References

Austrian football clubs 2011–12 season
2011-2012
Austria Wien